Cirkus Bukowsky is a Czech crime television series. It was directed by Jan Pachl, who is the author of the script and, together with Josef Viewegh, also participated in the theme.

Description
The first six-part series in the nature of a road movie, with the main character of psychologist Nestor Bukowski, premiered in 2013. Second season switched more focus to Lieutenant Kuneš gained more space.

The concept of the series reflects the dark style of modern Nordic crime fiction with a slower pace of action. The two parts of the series are primarily connected by the title character of the criminal investigator Lieutenant Kuneš, who in the second series continues to work with the other main character, Nestor Bukowsky, when new facts emerged in the case of the murder of young Edita Tichá. Another accompanying criminal motif was added to this storyline from the first part of the series - arranged murders as unfortunate coincidences.

In 2013, author Jan Pachl expressed his intention to film a criminal spin-off called Rapl with the main character of the investigator Kuneš. Czech Television produced and broadcast the new series in 2016.

Cast
 Pavel Řezníček as Nestor Bukowsky
 Hynek Čermák as Kuneš
 Marika Šoposká as Vesna
 Jan Vlasák as Srnka
 Bohumil Klepl as Zachar
 Predrag Bjelac as Luka Coltello
 Vanda Hybnerová as Andrea
 Adéla Petřeková as Edita Tichá
 Karel Dobrý as Hartman
 Štěpán Benoni as Miky Lébl
 Jana Pidrmanová as Pokorná
 Teresa Branna as Daria
 Matěj Hádek as Žďárský
 Šárka Vaculíková as Markéta
 Jiří Untermüller as cardiologist
 Lukáš Jůza as Tejc
 Petra Bojko as Zachová
 Barbora Mottlová as bank employee
 Jan Teplý ml. as fachman
 Jiří Wohanka as pathologist
 Klára Cibulková as Kuneš' ex-wife
 Norbert Lichý as Čingy
 Barbora Mudrová as Markéta

References

External links 
Official site
IMDB site
ČSFD site

Czech crime television series
2013 Czech television series debuts
Czech Television original programming